The 1927 Kent State Golden Flashes football team represented Kent State during the 1927 college football season. In its third season under head coach Merle E. Wagoner, Kent State compiled a 1–5–1 record and was outscored by a total of 80 to 25.

On defense, the team was markedly improved, giving up only 79 points in seven games. On offense, however, the team was shut out in five games and totaled only 25 points on the season.

During the football season, students began a band organization. "Although this effort was not as auspicious as it might have been, the seed was sown, and indications are that there will be a strong band next year."

Schedule

Roster 
The following players participated on the 1927 team: 
 Chernin; 
 "Curtie" Curtiss, end
 A. Davis, end 
 Chet Davis
 H. Dunlavy, guard
 Earley, guard
 W. "Ole" Fisher, halfback
 Graber, tackle
 L. Hinkle, end
 "C Major" Hinkle, guard 
 "Cocky" Hinkle, fullback
 "Bob" Kelso, tackle
 Kilbourne;  
 W. "Red" McCaslin, tackle
 Donald Menough, quarterback and acting captain 
 "Jimmy" Menough, halfback
 "Tiny" Paulus, guard
 Pettay, guard
 "Ted" Sapp, tackle
 Jake Searl, quarterback and captain elect for 1928 
 Sloop, halfback
 "Dud" Vair, end
 Claude Vair, manager

References

Kent State
Kent State Golden Flashes football seasons
Kent State Golden Flashes football